Elimar is a given name. Notable people with the name include:

 Elimar I, Count of Oldenburg
 Elimar II, Count of Oldenburg
 Duke Elimar of Oldenburg (1844–1895)
 Elimar Klebs (1852–1918), German historian

German masculine given names